Helodiamea is a genus of minute sea snails, marine gastropod mollusks or micromollusks in the family Pyramidellidae, the pyrams and their allies.

Species
Species within the genus Helodiamea include:
 Helodiamea attracta Peñas & Rolán, 2017
 Helodiamea circumfimbria Peñas & Rolán, 2017
 Helodiamea conglobationis Peñas & Rolán, 2017
 Helodiamea creta Peñas & Rolán, 2017
 Helodiamea elevataspira Peñas & Rolán, 2017
 Helodiamea fijiensis Peñas & Rolán, 2017
 Helodiamea firma Peñas, Rolán & Sabelli, 2020
 Helodiamea gisna (Dall & Bartsch, 1904)
 Helodiamea martinezae Peñas & Rolán, 2017
 Helodiamea prima Peñas, Rolán & Sabelli, 2020
 Helodiamea valdesi Peñas & Rolán, 2017

References

 Peñas A. & Rolán E. (2017). Deep water Pyramidelloidea from the central and South Pacific. The tribe Chrysallidini. ECIMAT (Estación de Ciencias Mariñas de Toralla), Universidade de Vigo. 412 pp

External links

Pyramidellidae